"Look Mama" is a song from Howard Jones' 1985 album Dream Into Action. Released as the second single from the album, the song reached #10 in the UK Singles Chart.  It was not released as a single in the US, but a different mix to those issued in the UK was included on the US-only remix album Action Replay.

The introduction to the song features some spoken dialogue sampled from the 1974 film Alice Doesn't Live Here Anymore.

"Look Mama" is written from the standpoint of a child pleading with his over-protective mother to be allowed greater independence and room to develop his own personality.

Track listing

7"
"Look Mama" – 4:03
"Learning How to Love" – 5:20

12"
"Look Mama (Extended Mix)" – 9:05
"Learning How to Love" – 5:20
"Dream Into Action (Live at the Manchester Apollo)"

Limited Edition 12"
"Look Mama (Megamamamix)" – 9:12
"Learning How to Love" – 5:20
"Dream Into Action (Live at the Manchester Apollo)"

References

External links
Official Howard Jones website discography

1985 singles
Howard Jones (English musician) songs
Songs written by Howard Jones (English musician)
1985 songs
Song recordings produced by Rupert Hine
Warner Music Group singles